A list of films released in Singapore in  2010.

2010

References 

2010
Singaporean
Films